Over the past century the Indonesian art of batik-making has become firmly established in Sri Lanka. The Batik industry in Sri Lanka is a small scale industry which can employ individual design talent and creativity. Its economic benefit is profit from dealing with foreign customers. It is now the most visible of the island's crafts with galleries and factories, large and small, having sprung up in many tourist areas. Rows of small stalls selling batiks can be found all along Hikkaduwa's Galle Road strip. Mahawewa, on the other hand, is famous for its batik factories.

Batiks incorporate many motifs and colours, some traditional, others highly contemporary and individual. Many display a vigorousness of design related to their origin. The material created by the batik-makers is used to produce distinctive dresses, shirts, sarongs and beachwear well-suited for tropical climes. Many tourists at seaside resorts such as Hikkaduwa wear batik clothes throughout their holiday. Apart from clothes, tablecloths, wall pictures, beach clothes, pure cotton and silk, men's and ladies' wear and bed covers are popular as a reminder of a visit to Sri Lanka.

Batiks originated many centuries ago with the villagers and tribesmen of what are now the country of Indonesia and has been brought to Sri Lanka by the Dutch. The promotion of the village arts is a way of keeping alive an important part of a vibrant and beautiful culture. Many of Sri Lanka's batik paintings are imported directly from Javanese village artists. They use 100-percent cotton cloth and all dyes used are colour-fast.

The batik art panels provide quilters, craft and home sewers, and interior designers with an opportunity to combine an ancient art form with a contemporary use. Since each batik piece is individually handmade, the colours and designs may vary. Originally, when batik-making was a cottage industry, one artist created the entire batik from start to finish.

Industry in Sri Lanka
Sri Lankan clothing
Indonesian clothing
Batik
Textile arts